Pansarbandvagn 301 (pbv 301), meaning roughly armoured tracked carrier vehicle 301, was a Swedish infantry fighting vehicle used by the Swedish Army. It was designed to carry a squad of 8 fully armed panzergrenadiers into battle and provide direct-fire support for them in combat. The panzergrenadiers could opt to either fight from inside the vehicle through hatches on the roof or dismount the vehicle and fight in its vicinity. The pbv 301 was armed with a Bofors  L/70 aircraft gun taken from scrapped Saab 21 fighter aircraft, mounted in an oscillating housing above a rotating cupola. It was fed from 75 round belts stored inside the vehicle (450 rounds total). Inside the vehicle were mountings for a variety of infantry weapons and munitions, such as an FN MAG and a Carl Gustaf 8.4 cm recoilless rifle with 9 rounds.

The pbv 301 was an interim solution, built on the chassis from the obsolete stridsvagn m/41 tank (in service since 1942). It was introduced in 1961 and removed from service in the late 1960s and early 1970s when the replacement pbv 302 came into use. The pbv 301 replaced the open-topped terrängbil m/42 KP IFV as the main infantry fighting vehicle of the Swedish Army.

Images

Variants 
Pansarbandvagn 301 - Infantry fighting vehicle version, 185 produced
Stridsledningspansarbandvagn 3011 (slpbv 3011) - Command version, 20 produced
Eldledningspansarbandvagn 3012 (epbv 3012) - Artillery observer version, 15 produced

Footnotes

Sources

External links 

 Pansarbandvagn 301 at Axvall
 Bofors presentation reel

Armoured personnel carriers of Sweden
Tracked armoured personnel carriers
Military vehicles introduced in the 1960s
Infantry fighting vehicles of the Cold War